State Route 14 (SR-14) is a state highway in southern Utah, running for  in Iron and Kane Counties from Cedar City to Long Valley Junction. The highway has been designated the Markagaunt High Plateau Scenic Byway as part of the Utah Scenic Byways program.

Route description

SR-14 begins at an intersection with SR-130 in central Cedar City and heads east out of the city.  It then turns southeast and climbs into the Markagunt Plateau, then intersects SR-148 to  Cedar Breaks National Monument and Brian Head.  It then continues generally southeast past Navajo Lake and through Duck Creek Village before ending at an intersection with US-89 at Long Valley Junction.

History
The road from SR-1 (by 1926 US-91, now SR-130) in Cedar City to SR-11 (US-89) at Long Valley Junction was added to the state highway system in 1912 and numbered SR-14 in the 1920s. A branch from Cedar Breaks Junction to Cedar Breaks National Monument was added in 1927, but in 1931 it was renumbered SR-55, and is now part of SR-148.

On October 8, 2011, a mountainside adjacent to the highway near mile marker 8 gave way and a landslide removed about 1300 feet of roadway, closing the highway for more than seven months. The road reopened to limited traffic on May 12 and was fully opened on August 4, 2012. A similar incident took place in 1989, closing the highway for months until repairs were made.

Major intersections

See also

 List of state highways in Utah

References

External links

014
014
 014
 014